Beyt-e Maluh (also Romanized as Beyt-e Malūḩ, Baité Malooh, and Beyt-e Mallūḩ; also known as Beyt-e Mallūkh) is a village in Veys Rural District, Veys District, Bavi County, Khuzestan Province, Iran. At the 2006 census, its population was 77, in 10 families.

References 

Populated places in Bavi County